= NAPPS =

- National Association of Proprietors of Private Schools
- Formation: November 25, 2005; 20 years ago
- Founded at: Abuja
- Headquarters: Abuja
- Location: Nigeria
- National President: Hajia Samira Jibir, PhD., FNAE. National President, NAPPS Nigeria.
- Website: https://www.napps.com.org/

The National Association of Proprietors of Private Schools (NAPPS) is the highest body of private school owners in Nigeria. It has branches in the thirty-six states and its headquarters is located in Abuja.

== History ==
The association was founded on 25 November 2005 in Abuja after meetings by the presidents of associations of private schools in the thirty-six states of the federation. The association was created to promote the interaction and communication of proprietors of private schools in Nigeria to increase the quality of the education given to pupils.

== National president ==
The national President of NAPPS is Chief Yomi Otubela. (Proprietor, Lagooz Schools)

== Mission ==
NAPPS is to provide knowledge, skills, and orientation needed for national development and transformation.
